Jetisfaction was a German virtual airline based at Münster Osnabrück Airport.

History 
Jetisfaction was founded as business charter airline. It subsequently started scheduled operations effective 8 September 2011 with routes from its home base at Münster/Osnabrück to Zürich, Poznan and Wroclaw. All flights were operated by a Saab 340A of Polish airline SkyTaxi and other airline's aircraft up to the required demand.

A planned additional scheduled route to London-Southend had to be postponed in October 2011 while the company was supposedly in search for new investors. However, Jetisfaction filed for insolvency and ceased all operations in early 2012.

Destinations 

Jetisfaction marketed the following scheduled destinations:

 Münster/Osnabrück - Münster Osnabrück International Airport base
 Poznan - Poznań–Ławica Airport
 Wroclaw - Copernicus Airport Wrocław
 Zürich - Zürich Airport

Fleet 
Jetisfaction had no own aircraft. The operations ran with other contracted airlines and their equipment.

References

External links

 

Defunct airlines of Germany
Airlines disestablished in 2012